A. K. M. Asaduzzaman is a judge of the High Court Division of Bangladesh Supreme Court.

Early life 
Asaduzzaman was born on 1 March 1959. He completed his bachelors and masters in law from University of Rajshahi.

Career 
Asaduzzaman joined the District Courts as a lawyer on 5 September 1983.

On 5 September 1985, Asaduzzaman became a lawyer of the High Court Division.

Asaduzzaman became a lawyer of the Appellate Division of Bangladesh Supreme Court on 25 October 2001.

On 27 August 2003, Asaduzzaman was appointed an Additional Judge of the High Court Division.

Asaduzzaman was made a permanent judge of the High Court Division on 27 August 2005.

On 15 June 2012, Asaduzzaman and Justice Mahmudul Hoque were given the task to hear bail and appeals petitions in the High Court Division. On 31 July, Asaduzzaman and Justice Abu Taher Md Saifur Rahman scrapped a 10 year prison sentence of Giasuddin Al Mamun on a 2008 tax evasion case.

On 7 June 2016, Asaduzzaman and Justice Ataur Rahman Khan granted bail to the editor of The Daily Star, Mahfuz Anam, in 10 cases. Anam had 82 cases against him including 65 defamation and 17 sedition case.

On 26 November 2017, Asaduzzaman and Justice Razik-Al-Jalil granted bail to Bangladesh Nationalist Party politician Mahatab Uddin Ahmmed Chowdhury Minar is a 2014 murder case over the death of Ekramul Haq, an Awami League politician.

Asaduzzaman and Justice SM Mozibur Rahman on 23 July 2018 order Comilla special judges court to quickly dispose of the case against former Prime Minister Khaleda Zia. Asaduzzaman and Justice SM Mozibur Rahman granted bail on 30 July 2018 to Mahmudur Rahman, editor of Amar Desh, in a defamation case regarding comments he made about the family of President Sheikh Mujibur Rahman. On 6 August 2018, Asaduzzaman and Justice SM Mozibur Rahman rejected the bail petition of former Prime Minister Khaleda Zia in a 2015 murder case over an arson attack on a bus in Comilla.

On 20 June 2019, Asaduzzaman and Justice SM Mozibur Rahman granted bail to Amanur Rahman Khan Rana, Awami League Member of Parliament from Tangail-3, in a murder case from 2012.

On 14 October 2020, Asaduzzaman and Justice Kazi Md Ejarul Haque Akondo refused to grant bail to family members of lawyer of the Bangladesh Supreme Court Asif Imtiaz khan Jisad who had been accused of being involved in his death.

On 28 September 2021, Asaduzzaman and Justice Kazi Md Ejarul Haque Akondo extended the bail of former Prime Minister Khaleda Zia.

References 

Living people
1959 births
University of Rajshahi alumni
20th-century Bangladeshi lawyers
Supreme Court of Bangladesh justices
21st-century Bangladeshi judges